Hard labor or labour is another term for penal labour, punishment combining imprisonment with arduous manual labor. 

Hard labor may also refer to:

Manual labour, physically challenging work
Hard Labor, a 1974 album by Three Dog Night
Hard Labor (film), a 2011 Brazilian film
Hard Labour (film), a 1973 British television film
Hard Labor: The First African Americans, 1619, a 2004 book by Patricia and Fredrick McKissack
Hard Labour, U.S. Virgin Islands, a settlement on the island of Saint Croix

See also
Hard Labor Creek (disambiguation), several places
Treaty of Hard Labour, a 1768 treaty between the British and the Cherokee tribe in North America